Zítra to roztočíme, drahoušku…!  is a Czechoslovak comedy film released in 1976.

External links
 

1976 films
Czechoslovak comedy films
1976 comedy films
Czech comedy films
1970s Czech films